The 1930–31 La Liga season started December 7, 1930, and finished April 5, 1931.

Athletic Bilbao defended the title successfully and won the league thanks to its better goal difference in a three-way draw in the first position.
Alavés made their debut in La Liga.

Team information

League table

Results

Top scorers
Note: this year there are no difference between La liga top scorers and the Pichichi Trophy

References
La liga top scorers 1930–31

External links
LFP website
Clásico Español Barça – Madrid

1930 1931
1930–31 in Spanish football leagues
Spain